There are at least 75 named lakes and reservoirs in Granite County, Montana.

Lakes
 Albicaulis Lake, el. 
 Alpine Lake, el. 
 Altoona Lakes, el. 
 Bielenberg Lake, el. 
 Boulder Lakes, el. 
 Carpp Lake, el. 
 Copper Creek Lakes, el. 
 Crystal Lake, el. 
 Dead Lake, el. 
 Dora Thorn Lake, el. 
 Echo Lake, el. 
 Edith Lake, el. 
 Flower Lake, el. 
 Fred Burr Lake, el. 
 Fuse Lake, el. 
 George Lake, el. 
 Goat Mountain Lakes, el. 
 Gold Creek Lakes, el. 
 Green Canyon Lake, el. 
 Green Lake, el. 
 Hidden Lake, el. 
 Hunters Lake, el. 
 Ivanhoe Lake, el. 
 Johnson Lake, el. 
 Kaiser Lake, el. 
 Kroger Pond, el. 
 Lake Abundance, el. 
 Lion Lake, el. 
 Little Fish Lake, el. 
 Little Fred Burr Lake, el. 
 Little Johnson Lake, el. 
 Little Racetrack Lake, el. 
 Lower Carpp Lake, el. 
 Martin Lake, el. 
 Meadow Lakes, el. 
 Meadow Lakes, el. 
 Medicine Lake, el. 
 Milo Lake, el. 
 Moose Lake, el. 
 Mud Lake, el. 
 Mud Lake, el. 
 Page Lake, el. 
 Phyllis Lake, el. 
 Porcupine Lake, el. 
 Potato Lakes, el. 
 Pozega Lakes, el. 
 Racetrack Lake, el. 
 Rainbow Lake, el. 
 Sauer Lake, el. 
 Sidney Lake, el. 
 Spruce Lake, el. 
 Stewart Lake (Granite County, Montana), el. 
 Stony Lake, el. 
 Susie Lake, el. 
 Tamarack Lake, el. 
 Thompson Lake (Granite County, Montana), el. 
 Thornton Lake, el. 
 Tolean Lake, el. 
 Upper Carpp Lake, el. 
 Upper Phyllis Lake, el. 
 Whetstone Lake, el.

Reservoirs
 Albicaulis Lake, el. 
 Alpine Lake, el. 
 Big Pozega Lake, el. 
 East Fork Reservoir, el. 
 Fisher Lake, el. 
 Georgetown Lake, el. 
 Gold Creek Lake, el. 
 Goldberg Reservoir, el. 
 Green Lake, el. 
 Little Pozega Lake, el. 
 Lower Willow Creek Reservoir, el. 
 Mud Lake, el. 
 Racetrack Lake, el. 
 Stephens Reservoir, el.

See also
 List of lakes in Montana

Notes

Bodies of water of Granite County, Montana
Granite